WASP-7, also identified as HD 197286, is a  type F star located about 520 light years away in the constellation Microscopium. This star is a little larger and about 28% more massive than the Sun and is also brighter and hotter. At magnitude 9 the star cannot be seen by the naked eye but is visible through a small telescope.

Planetary system
The SuperWASP project announced an extrasolar planet, WASP-7b, orbiting this star in 2008. The planet appears to be another hot Jupiter, a dense planet with Jupiter's mass orbiting very close to a hot star and thus emitting enough heat to shine.

See also
 SuperWASP
 List of extrasolar planets

References

External links
 

Microscopium
F-type main-sequence stars
Planetary transit variables
Planetary systems with one confirmed planet
197286
Durchmusterung objects
7
J20441022-3913309